Liechtenstein competed at the 2004 Summer Paralympics in Athens, Greece. The team included 1 athlete, but won no medals. Peter Frommelt, who had previously competed in 1988 and 1992, took part in the table tennis men's singles 8 event, reaching the semi-finals.

Sports

Table tennis

See also
Liechtenstein at the Paralympics
Liechtenstein at the 2004 Summer Olympics

References 

Nations at the 2004 Summer Paralympics
2004
Summer Paralympics